The whitelined toadfish (Sanopus greenfieldorum) is a species of fish in the family Batrachoididae. It is endemic to Belize. The specific name honours David W. Greenfield and Teresa Arambula Greenfield, who when they collected type specimen thought that it might belong to an undescribed species and so sent it to Bruce Baden Collette to be described.

References

Sanopus
Vertebrates of Belize
Endemic fauna of Belize
Fish of Central America
Fish described in 1983
Taxonomy articles created by Polbot